The  is a women's professional wrestling championship owned by the World Wonder Ring Stardom promotion. The title was introduced on February 18, 2018, and the inaugural champion was crowned on March 28, when Starlight Kid defeated Shiki Shibusawa in the finals of a five-woman single-elimination tournament. Initially, in order for a wrestler to challenge for the title, they must have been under twenty years old or have less than two years of experience in professional wrestling. But on December 20, 2020, the experience level requirement for the title was changed from two years to less than three years of wrestling experience, regardless of the wrestler's age.

Like most professional wrestling championships, the title is won as a result of a scripted match. There have been a total of nine reigns shared among nine different wrestlers and two vacancies. The current champion is God's Eye's Ami Sourei who is in her first reign.

Title history

Vacant championship tournament (2021) 
Due to Saya Iida relinquishing the title after suffering an injury, a seven-woman tournament to crown a new champion was announced to kick off on the second night of the Stardom Cinderella Tournament 2021 on May 14, 2021, and culminated on July 4 at Yokohama Dream Cinderella 2021 in Summer.

Reigns

Combined reigns 

{| class="wikitable sortable" style="text-align: center"
!Rank
!Wrestler
!No. ofreigns
!Combineddefenses
!Combineddays
|-
!1
| || 1 || 6 || 409
|-
!2
| || 1 || 10 || 294
|-
!3
| || 1 || 5 || 281
|-
!4
| || 1 || 2 || 156
|-
!5
|style="background-color:#FFE6BD"| † || 1 || 3 || +
|-
!6
| || 1 || 3 || 141
|-
!7
| || 1 || 3 || 84
|-
!8
| || 1 || 2 || 81
|-
!9
| || 1 || 0 || 13

References

External links 
 World Wonder Ring Stardom's official website

World Wonder Ring Stardom championships
Women's professional wrestling championships